Erin Boheme is an American jazz singer.

Boheme was born in Oshkosh, Wisconsin in 1986. When she was fifteen, she and her mother went to Los Angeles to look for a record deal. They returned to Wisconsin unsuccessful. In 2004 Mike Melvoin, a native of Oshkosh, was nominated for a Grammy Award, and Boheme sent her congratulations. Melvoin asked her to work on his records, and he became a mentor. When she was eighteen, she was offered a contract by Concord Records, which released her debut album, What Love Is, in 2006. Her second album, What a Life, was produced by Michael Bublé.

In 2017, Boheme sang at the inauguration of President Donald Trump.

Discography
 What Love Is (Concord, 2006)
 What a Life (Heads Up, 2013)

References

People from Oshkosh, Wisconsin
Singers from Wisconsin
American women jazz singers
American jazz singers
Living people
Concord Records artists
1986 births
21st-century American women singers